Advance is an unincorporated community in Tulare County, California, United States. Advance was the site of the Kaweah Cooperative Colony, an experimental socialist which existed from 1885 to 1891. A post office opened in the community in 1890; it was moved to Kaweah in 1910.

References

Unincorporated communities in Tulare County, California
Unincorporated communities in California